Pascal Michel Ghislain Delannoy (born 2 April 1957) is the current Bishop of Saint-Denis in France. He had previously served as an auxiliary bishop of the Roman Catholic Archdiocese of Lille.

Biography
Delannoy was born in Comines, in the Department of Nord, the son of Jacques Delannoy, the owner of a lumber yard, and Anne-Marie Carissimo. He did his elementary education at the Institution Saint-Jude in Armentières, followed by attending the Lycée Saint Paul. Following completion of his secondary education, he studied economics at the Catholic University of Lille, ending with a Master's degree. He then worked as an accountant for four years.

At that point, Delannoy left the field and decided to seek Holy orders. He entered the Seminary of Lille, where he pursued his training for the priesthood. He was ordained a priest on 4 June 1989 for the then-Diocese of Lille by Bishop Gérard Defois.

Delannoy then served in a parish in Roubaix for two years, after which he was made responsible for diocesan activities in independent sites (1991–1999), and in 1997 was also named the Dean of the urban district of Roubaix and of Bailleul. In 1999 he was appointed the Episcopal Vicar of the region of French Flanders, and additionally, in 2003, Dean of Houtland.

Delannoy was appointed the auxiliary bishop of the diocese, and named titular bishop of Usinaza, by Pope John Paul II on 30 June 2004. He was consecrated 12 September of that year by Bishop Defois.

On 10 March 2009 Pope Benedict XVI appointed him Bishop of Saint Denis. He was installed on 10 May.

In the Bishops' Conference of France, Delannoy currently serves as the President of the Episcopal Commissions on Finances and on Economic, Social and Legal Affairs.

See also
 Catholic Church in France
 List of the Roman Catholic dioceses of France

References

1957 births
Living people
21st-century French Roman Catholic bishops
French accountants
Lille Catholic University alumni
People from Comines, Nord